Martin Edmund Kiszko (born 9 February 1958) is a British composer, musicologist, librettist and poet. He is best known for his film and television scores.

Biography

Kiszko's family hails from an area of Poland which is now Belarus and from Leeds, England. Kiszko began his music studies at age seven and was accepted at the Leeds City College of Music at age ten.

He studied music composition with Duncan Druce at Bretton Hall College (University of Leeds) and filmmaking with George Brandt at the University of Bristol, where he directed and scored the short film Skokholm Light. He later studied with Wyndham Thomas at Bristol to complete his PhD thesis on the growth of balalaika orchestras and the migration of the balalaika.

Kiszko's interests in film music were nurtured by veteran film composer Edward Williams, who was mentored by composer Ralph Vaughan Williams and British conductor Muir Mathieson. Kiszko assisted Williams from 1979 onwards when he began work on co-producing Williams' album Music for Life on Earth for the BBC David Attenborough series of the same name. They also created a touring live performance multi-media group – creating performances where instrumentalists transformed sound and video image in real time. The group has grown into the successful music and multi-media organisation Elektrodome.

Amongst Kiszko's well-known works are many of his film and TV scores: The Killing of John Lennon, The Uninvited, The Human Sexes, Alien Empire, Battle of the Sexes, Realms of the Russian Bear, Land of the Eagle, Omnibus, Newsround, Wildlife on One and The Natural World. Several of his scores have won awards, including Best Music Video for Dreamworks, an eight-minute natural history promo made by the BBC for Steven Spielberg. He has also released eight albums featuring major European orchestras.

Kiszko's popularity increased as a result of introducing the BBC Natural History Unit to the possibilities for sampling indigenous instruments overseas on Realms of the Russian Bear. He successfully pioneered the technique by recording instrumentalists from the former Soviet republics at the Melodia Recording Studios, Moscow in 1991. The recordings were subsequently inputted into keyboard samplers. Later, his interest in the palette and epic scale of symphonic scores enabled him to introduce the BBC Natural History Unit to the use of Eastern European orchestras in the mid-nineties. In 2008 Kiszko returned to the electro-acoustic palette of his earlier works in the score for Andrew Piddington's feature film The Killing of John Lennon.

Kiszko's film music draws on an eclectic range of styles and devices whilst maintaining an original voice. Amongst his interests are the symphony orchestra, electronic music, the use of autochthonous instruments and the subliminal effects of the film score. He has also worked in the rock and folk arenas with band Lies Damned Lies (as a Navajo flute player) and with Maddy Prior on a collaborative score for the BBC Wildlife on One film Shadow of the Hare.

His interest in the live interplay of image and music has led him to experiment and create with Soundbeam, an ultrasonic series of beams that act as invisible keyboards in space. With each beam containing up to 128 invisible divisions, each division can become the start and stop button to turn on and project a video sequence, a sequence of a stills or trigger a sequence or note of music. His work, in conjunction with The Soundbeam Project, led to the creation of Inua, a live performance piece which won 2004 Composer of the Year (Community and Education) from the British Academy of Composers and Songwriters.

As well as his film and television work, Kiszko's major concert works include two cantatas: Sea Star with a libretto by poet Anne Ridler OBE, and A Radius of Curves – a work with his own libretto and accompanying film – which tells the story of the construction of Brunel's Great Western Railway.

Kiszko completed his PhD thesis, "The Origins and Place of the Balalaika in Russian Culture, its Migration to the USA, and the Dissemination of Balalaika Orchestras in America with Particular Reference to the Kasura and Kutin Collections at the University of Illinois," in 1999. His research paper on the instrument, "The Balalaika – a Reappraisal", was the first to be published in the West since 1900 and appeared in The Galpin Society Journal. He later wrote the entry for the balalaika in The New Grove Dictionary of Music.

Since 2010 Kiszko has also pursued his interests in environmentalism and wrote two collections of poetry on eco themes: "Green Poems for a Blue Planet" and "Verse for the Earth" both illustrated by Wallace and Gromit creator Nick Park. Kiszko's one man show based on the books has been performed in China, Dubai, Los Angeles, Malta, three times in India, around the UK, and at the 2015 Edinburgh Fringe Festival. In 2016 the University of Bristol awarded him an honorary Doctor of Letters for his work.

Full credits list: Film, TV, concert and multi-media scores
 Cinematic Features
 2007 – The Killing of John Lennon, 1 × 112'
 Feature Drama Scores
 Zastrozzi – A Romance (C4/WNET) 1 × 90'. 102' chamber orchestral score.
 Black Hearts in Battersea (BBC) 2 × 90'. 79' score. Chamber orchestral and sampled. Also conductor.
 The Levels (HTV) 1 × 90'. 26' sampled score.
 The Uninvited (ITV/Zenith) 2 × 2hrs. Orchestral and sampled. Also conductor.
 Shorts
 The Nutter Tales, Children's series TV pilot for The Mob Film Co. Director Vadim Jean.
 Dreamworks Promo (BBC) 1997. Requested by Steven Spielberg – an 8' 30" orchestral score featuring City of Prague Philharmonic. Awarded Best Music Video, Missoula Film Festival, USA, 1997.
 Millennium Dome (BBC) 6 × 30'. 1999. Films for the BBC and Millennium Dome.
 Unification – King Abdul Aziz (Saudi Arabian National Museum) 1998. 15' orchestral score for City of Prague Philharmonic to accompany film and laser show at the museum.
 Albums and Album Tracks
 The Ocellus Suite, – Featuring the music from the BBC's Alien Empire. (Soundtrack/EMI Records) 72' 1996. Album of Martin Kiszko music featuring the Munich Symphony Orchestra.
 The Uninvited (Oceandeep Soundtracks) 71' 1997. Album of Martin Kiszko music performed and conducted by Martin Kiszko and featuring the London Film Orchestra.
 The Age Demanded, 74' 1999. Album of Martin Kiszko music representing works since 1983.
 Battle of the Sexes (BBC/Silva Screen Records) 60' 1999. Album of Martin Kiszko music featuring City of Prague Philharmonic.
 The Millennium March, 1999. Spoof album to mark the Millennium. Performed by the City of Prague Philharmonic and Martin Kiszko.
 Sea Star, 2001. Cantata for Tenor, 150 singers and symphony orchestra. Words by Anne Ridler. World premiere recording. 30 June 2001. Clifton Cathedral, Bristol.
 A Radius of Curves, 2006. Cantata for soloist, choir, orchestra and film. Words by Brunel/Martin Kiszko. Commissioned by Brunel 200 to celebrate IK Brunel's 200th Birthday. World premiere 31 March 2006, Clifton Cathedral, Bristol.
 St. John's School Millennium CD 2000. Originator, Executive producer and Sound producer for this package which portrays the lives of 260 children during Millennium year.
 Maddy Prior – Year, Composition of track 9d 'Winter Wakeneth'.
 Lies Damned Lies – Flying Kites, Navajo flute performance and arrangement on track 'The Big Picture.'
 The Killing of John Lennon (2007) Original Soundtrack Score composed and conducted by Martin Kiszko. 57' 00". Featuring the Bristol Ensemble.
 Film Drama Scores – Titles and Incidental Music
 The Uninvited (ITV/Zenith) 4 × 60' Drama Series. 1997. 80' Chamber orchestral and sampled score.
 Zastrozzi-a Romance (C4) 4 × 50' Drama Series. 1986. 102' Chamber orchestral score.
 Capture
 Conspiracy
 Seduction
 Murder
 Black Hearts in Battersea (BBC1) 6 × 30' Drama Series. 1995. 79' Chamber orchestral and sampled score. Also conductor.
 Just Desserts (HTV) 1 × 30' Drama directed by Vadim Jean. 2000. Instrumental and sampled score.
 Steps (HTV) 1 × 30' Drama directed by Martin Kiszko. 2000. Sampled score.
 The Levels (ITV Feature Film) 1 × 90'. Sampled score.
 Animation
 Sweet Disaster (C4) 5 × 10' animation series.
 Series titles and incidental for films Dreamless Sleep (Best Film Zagreb Festival 1986) and Conversations by a Californian Swimming Pool. Electronic and musique-concrete scores performed by Martin Kiszko.
 Social Documentaries
 Skin Deep (Discovery) 3 × 50' 2002. For Vadim Jean's The Mob Productions. Acoustic jazz score. Also conductor.
 Life Class (Carlton/HTV) 7 × 30'. 2002. Sampled score.
 City of Fire (HTV) 1 × 25'. 2000. Sampled score.
 Who on Earth (BBC1) 5 × 15'. 1999. Instrumental, vocal and sampled score. Also conductor.
 Hotel (HTV/ITV) 6 × 30'. 1997. 40' Sampled score.
 Guess Who's Coming to Dinner?
 Peas and Queues
 Goodbye Mr. Kitts
 Jobs for the Boys
 Christmas Spirit
 Spoiled for Choice
 The Nineties (BBC2) 8 × 40'. 1993. 86' Chamber orchestral score. Also conductor.
 And They Sailed Away
 The Demon in the Glass
 Fresh Air and Fun
 I Married a Stranger
 All Your Kisses are Mine
 You Win Some, You Lose Some
 We Grinned and Bared it
 Pennies on their Eyes
 A New Way of Living (ITV) 6 × 30'. 1986. Chamber orchestral score. Also conductor.
 The Countryside in Question (ITV) 6 × 40'. 1987. Chamber orchestral and vocal score. Also conductor.
 A Green and Pleasant Land
 Change in the Village
 Pleasing Prospects
 A Natural World?
 An Urban Playspace
 Whose Countryside?
 Channel Traders (ITV) 5 × 30'. 1988. Sampled score.
 Voyage of the Irene
 Bound for Gloucester
 Cruise with the Waverley
 Voyage with the Peggy
 Peggy – Out of Ilfracombe
 The K and A (The Kennett and Avon Canal) (HTV/C4) 4 × 30'. 1990. Sampled score.
 By Honey Street to the Thames
 The Big Lift
 A Breath of Fresh Air
 The Last Lock
 Omagh – One Year On (ITV) 1999. Instrumental score. Also conductor/performer.
 War and Peace – Gaze of the Gorgon (BBC) 1992. by Tony Harrison. Chamber orchestral and sampled score. Also conductor.
 Splendid Hearts – Enniskillen (BBC) 1992. Instrumental score. Also conductor.
 Paradise Road (A Night of Love) – How to Write a Mills and Boon (BBC) 1992. Chamber orchestral score. Also conductor.
 Seven Faces of Everest (BBC) 1993. Sampled score.
 Locomotion – Ep: 2 Taming the Iron Monster (BBC) 1993. Incidental choral and chamber orchestral score.
 Hotel – Network Version (ITV) 1997. Sampled score.
 Imperial Splendours – A Dreamworld of Palaces in Paradise (Reader's Digest) Sampled score.

 Natural History
 Battle of the Sexes (BBC/Discovery) 6 × 30'. 1999. 80' Score for City Of Prague Philharmonic.
 Ways of Being Male
 Choosy Females
 Race for the Egg
 Parental Dilemma
 Family Affairs
 The Riddle of Sex
 Alien Empire (BBC1/WNET) 6 × 30' 1995. 90' Orchestral score performed By Munich Symphony Orchestra.
 Hardware
 Replicators
 Battlezone
 Voyagers
 Metropolis
 War of the Worlds
 Desmond Morris' The Human Sexes (Discovery/BBC) 6 × 60'. 1997. 70' Chamber orchestral and sampled score. Also conductor.
 Male and Female
 Language of the Sexes
 Patterns of Love
 Passages of Life
 The Maternal Dilemma
 The Gender Wars
 Realms of the Russian Bear (BBC/WNET) 6 × 50'. 1992. 94' Score for orchestra, Russian native instruments and samples.  Recorded Moscow and London. Grand Teton Award, Jackson Hole Film Festival, USA, 1993 – Best film series.
 Green Jewel of the Caspian
 Into the Celestial Mountains
 The Red Deserts
 The Arctic Frontier
 The Frozen Forest
 Born Of Fire
 Land Of The Eagle (BBC/WNET) 8 × 50'. 1989. 160' Score for orchestra, early music ensemble, native American instruments, vocals and samples.
 The Great Encounter
 Confronting the Wilderness
 Conquering the Swamps
 Across the Sea of Grass
 Into the Shining Mountains
 Living on the Edge
 The First and Last Frontier
 Searching for Paradise
 Magic Animals (BBC) 4 × 30'. 1994. Sampled score performed by Martin Kiszko.
 The Wolf
 The Bear
 The Dolphin
 The Snake
 The Natural History of an Alien (BBC) 1997. As part of the BBC's 'Life on Mars' weekend. Sampled score.
 World About Us – Forest in the Sea (BBC) 1983. Electro-acoustic score.
 Wildlife On One – Watervoles, a Life on the Edge (BBC). 1999. Sampled score.
 Wildlife On One – Shadow of the Hare (BBC). Chamber orchestral score with vocalist Maddy Prior. Also conductor.
 Wildlife On One – They Came from the Sea (BBC). Sampled score.
 Wildlife On One – The Tale of the Pregnant Male (BBC). Sampled score.
 Wildlife On One – Who Really Killed Cock Robin? (BBC). Sampled score.
 Wildlife On One – Kingdom of the Crabs (BBC). Sampled score. Winner of award for creative use of music and wildlife for education., 12th international Wildlife Film Festival, Missoula USA. 1989.
 Wildlife On One – Trivial Pursuit: The Natural Mystery of Play. (BBC). Sampled score.
 Wildlife On One – Blubber Lovers (BBC) String quartet and slide guitar. Also conductor.
 Wildlife On One – The Eagle Empire (BBC). Sampled and vocal score.
 Wildlife Showcase – A Symphony of Magic: Wild Orchids in Israel (BBC). Electronic score.
 The Natural World – Australia, Taking the Heat (BBC). Sampled score.
 The Natural World – The Taming of the Ewe (BBC). Sampled score.
 The Natural World – Even the Animals Must Be Free (BBC). Sampled score.
 The Natural World – Arctic Wanderers (BBC). Sampled score.
 The Natural World – Birdnuts: The Magnificent Obsession (BBC). Sampled score.
 The Natural World – Treasure of the Andes (BBC). Sampled score.
 The Natural World – Ytene the Ancient Forest (BBC). Sampled score.
 The Natural World – Pandas of the Sleeping Dragon (BBC). Featuring Chinese instruments performed by Zhao Ben, China's foremost multi-instrumentalist. Also conductor.
 The Natural World – Bower Bird: Playboy of the Australian Forest (BBC) Sampled score.
 The Natural World – Himalaya (BBC) Vocal and sampled score.
 The Natural World – Mandrills: Painted Faces of the Forest (BBC) African instrumental Score.
 The Natural World – Australia – Taking the Heat (BBC) 2005 Sampled score
 Born to be Wild – Operation Lemur with John Cleese (BBC) Sampled score. Unused.
 Nature – Death on the St. Lawrence (BBC) Sampled score.
 Nature – the Fourth Hurdle (BBC) Sampled score.
 The Nature of Australia, Ep.2 A Separate Creation. (BBC) Sampled score for kangaroo birth sequence.
 Franz Josef Land – A Frozen Wilderness, Ep: 3 An Arctic Secret (Partridge Films/Austrian TV) 1997. Sampled and vocal score. Also conductor.
 Alien Empire, – Series promo (BBC) Sampled score.
 Series titles music  as above plus
 Tastes Of Britain (C4) 1998. Sampled score.
 Omnibus (BBC) 1987–1990. Sampled score.
 Murder Squad (ITV) 1991–1994. Chamber orchestral and sampled score. Also conductor.
 The Natural World (BBC) 1992–1994. Orchestral score. Also conductor.
 The Natural World (BBC) 1996–2000. Instrumental and sampled score. Also conductor.
 The Natural World (BBC) 2000–2003. Instrumental and sampled Score.
 The Natural World Classics (BBC) 1997. Sampled score.
 The Art of Pleasing People (C4) 1987. Sampled score.
 Food And Drink (BBC) 1984–1986. Electronic score.
 Miniature Worlds (BBC) 1987–1995. Electronic score.
 Couples (BBC) 1987. Instrumental and electronic score.
 Wildworld (BBC) 1986–1995. Sampled score.
 Wildscreen, '86 (C4) 1986. Orchestral score. Also conductor.
 Hand in Hand (C4) 1986–1988. Instrumental and electronic score. Also conductor.
 Hand in Hand (C4) 1988–1990. Instrumental score. Also conductor.
 Weekend Outlook (HTV) 1984–1986. Electronic score.
 Scene (HTV) 1987–1989. Electronic and instrumental score.
 Hazard A Guess (ITV) 1987–1988. Electronic and instrumental score.
 The Cancer Question (BBC) 1990. Sampled score.
 Music for You and You and You (BBC) Instrumental and electronic score.
 Dance International (BBC) 1989–1990. Sampled score.
 Problems (HTV) 1989–1991. Sampled score.
 Sound On Film (BBC) 1988–1990. Musique-concrete and electronic score.
 John Tovey's Entertaining on a Plate (BBC) 1990–1991. Electronic score.
 Wildlife On Two (BBC) 1992–1996. Electronic score.
 Europe – on the Brink (BBC) 1993. Sampled score.
 Limited Edition (HTV) 1994–1997. Sampled score.
 Frieze Frame (HTV) 1997–1998. Sampled score.
 Light entertainment Keynotes (ITV) Electronic arrangements of popular songs plus computer programming for 45 episodes.
 The Weekend Starts Here (HTV). Specially commissioned musical piece performed live on the show by Martin Kiszko.
 Get Fresh (ITV). Instrumental arrangement of a song for film insert.
 Corporate theatrical release
 A Pattern of Energy (Total Oil). Titles and incidental music. Orchestral score.
 The Nature of the Thames (Thames Water Authority). Titles and incidental music. Chamber orchestral score. Also conductor.
 Flotsam (British Children's Film Foundation). Electronic score.
 Stuart Devlin – Master Goldsmith, Instrumental and electronic score.
 Radiotherapy (Bristol Radiotherapy Centre). Electro-acoustic score.
 The Cold Chain (United Nation WHO). Instrumental score.
 Prudential (Prudential Assurance Company). Electronic score.
 Upper Lid Surgery (Christofel Blinden Mission). Electronic score.
 In Search of Tomorrow (BP/Worldwide). Electronic score.
 Commercials
 Homeworld, instrumental and electronic score.
 3i Capital City, instrumental and electronic score.
 Totem Timber, instrumental score.
 Dance, concert, and stage works
 A Radius of Curves, 2006. Cantata for baritone, choir, orchestra and film. City of Bristol special commission to celebrate the 200th anniversary of Brunel's birth. World premiere Clifton Cathedral Bristol, 31 March 2006. Bristol Ensemble and Exultate Singers.
 Le Regard du Silence, 2004 dance work choreographed by Bernard Espinasse using some of the music of Martin Kiszko. Performed by the dancers of Ballet du Nord, France.
 Inua, 2003 – Multi-media music-dance-film work for 28 children, 4 Soundbeams (ultrasonics), 6 Soundbeam footswitches, Soundbeam manipulated pictures, vocals, flute, guitar and violin. World premiere 16 December 2003. Worcester Cathedral. Winner of 2004 Composer of the Year Award in the Community and Education category from the British Academy of Composers and Songwriters.
 After the Rain, Sergi Belbel play performed by German theatre company 'Augenblicke' using score from The Natural World – Himalaya.
 Sea Star, 2001. Cantata for tenor, 150 singers and symphony orchestra. Words by Anne Ridler. World premiere 30 June 2001. Clifton Cathedral, Bristol.
 Hearts of Earth and Fire, 1994. A choral and chamber orchestral work commissioned by Clifton Cathedral, Bristol. With words by poet Anne Ridler.
 The Man from Glasgow, 10 songs for Jack Marriott's black farce. Also music director and performer. Staged at Little Theatre, Colston Hall, Bristol.
 Grotz B. Grooble and the Gobgunger Revenge, Community theatre. Sampled score.
 Driving Passions, A musical.
 Romeo and Juliet, Cafe Arts Theatre world touring production using the score from Even the Animals Must be Free.
 Night Lights, 1986. A multi-media work for actor, slide projections, video, saxophone, percussion, synthesisers and live electronics.
 The Stratagem of Nauplius, 1984. A multi-media work for virtuoso trombonist James Fulkerson using video, live electronics and computer text. Performed at the Huddersfield Contemporary Music Festival 1984.
 Cairoglyph, 1983. A multi-media work for actor Tony Robinson. Scored for video, audiotape, piano and live electronics. Performed by Elektrodome at Bretton Hall College, West Yorkshire.
 Six Autumn Sketches, 1988. Clarinet and piano.
 Alwyn North, 1988. A concert overture for orchestra.
 Church Works
 Marriage Morning, 2003 For choir, Clt, Tbn, Pno, Org, Elec. Bass, Vln.
 Acclaim this Day, For choir, Latin percussion, piano, violin and electric bass.
 My Heart is Filled with Goodly Things, For tenor, choir, piano and cello.
 Unto us a Child is Born, For choir, flute, guitars, piano and electric bass. Performed live on BBC Radio Bristol.
 Sing it Aloud, For choir, synthesisers, saxophone and percussion.
 Trumpet Voluntary.
 Wedding March, Organ.
 This Child of Ours''', For tenor solo and piano.

Selected recordings ~ Martin Kiszko albums
 Zastrozzi - a Romance (2007) Original Soundtrack Score composed by Martin Kiszko. Cond. Harry Rabinowitz. 59' 27". Chamber Orchestra.
 The Killing of John Lennon (2007) Original Soundtrack Score composed and conducted by Martin Kiszko. 57' 00". Featuring The Emerald Ensemble.
 The Age Demanded, 2007 Film/TV Music (Re-release); MK20072; Martin Kiszko Soundtracks.
 A Radius of Curves, Cantata (Live Performance) 2006; Martin Kiszko Soundtracks; Emerald Ensemble/Exultate Singers cond. David Ogden; Dur. 44' 53".
 Sea Star, Cantata (Live Performance) 2001; Martin Kiszko Soundtracks/Hoxa; Spiritual Sounds Festival Orchestra and Choir cond. David Ogden; Dur. 40' 00".
 Battle of the Sexes, 1999 TV Soundtrack; Silva Screen Records; City of Prague Philharmonic; cond. Harry Rabinowitz; Dur. 61' 00".
 The Age Demanded, 1998 Film/TV Music, MK1010, Martin Kiszko Soundtracks; Munich Symphony Orchestra, City of Prague Philharmonic, London Film Orchestra and others; cond. Harry Rabinowitz, Allan Wilson, Martin Kiszko; Dur: 73' 30".
 The Uninvited, 1997 Film/TV Music; OC0007; Ocean Deep Soundtracks; London Film Orchestra/Ambrosian Singers cond. Martin Kiszko; Dur. 67' 15".
 The Millennium March, 2000 Spoof/comedy Album; MK2000; Martin Kiszko Soundtracks; City of Prague Philharmonic and others cond. Allan Wilson; Dur. 20' 20.
 The Ocellus Suite, music from the BBC's Alien Empire, 1995 Film/TV Music; 7243 8 3619023; BBC and Soundtrack Music Records Production; Munich Symphony Orchestra cond. Harry Rabinowitz; Dur. 70' 24".

External links
Official website 

Green Poems for a Blue Planet

British composers
British people of Polish descent
1958 births
Living people
Place of birth missing (living people)
Musicians from Leeds
Alumni of the University of Leeds